The Swenson Red is a firm, meaty red table grape with a unique fruity flavor with strawberry notes. This was the first grape released from the breeding efforts of Elmer Swenson, and is a favorite among grape breeders and hobbyists. Though it is known as a red, its actual color changes depending on climate. In cooler areas it will be blue, and in very warm areas it will be a translucent green. This is because many pigments inherited from Vitis vinifera only set during relatively cool weather.

Swenson Red is one of many successful cold hardy grape crosses involving the parent Minnesota 78. The pollinator parent for the cross is Seibel 11803 (Rubiland). Swenson Red has a female sibling named ES417 which has very similar characteristics which is a likely candidate for further breeding.

References 

Table grape varieties
Red wine grape varieties